The 2014–15 Oklahoma State Cowgirls basketball team will represent Oklahoma State University in the 2014–15 college basketball season. It was head coach Jim Littell's fourth season at Oklahoma State. The Cowgirls were members of the Big 12 Conference and will play their home games at the Gallagher-Iba Arena. They finished the season 20–12, 9–9 in Big 12 play for a four way tie to finish in third place. They advanced to the semifinals of the Big 12 women's tournament where they lost to Baylor. They received at-large bid of the NCAA women's basketball tournament where they lost in the first round to Florida Gulf Coast.

Roster

Schedule and results

|-
! colspan=9 style="background:#FF6600; color:#000000;"|Exhibition

|-
!colspan=9 style="background:#000000; color:#FF6600;"| Non-conference regular season

|-
!colspan=9 style="background:#000000; color:#FF6600;"|Conference Regular Season

|-
!colspan=12 style="background:#FF6600; color:#000000;"| 2015 Big 12 women's basketball tournament

|-
!colspan=12 style="background:#FF6600; color:#000000;"| NCAA women's tournament

Rankings
2014–15 NCAA Division I women's basketball rankings

See also
2014–15 Oklahoma State Cowboys basketball team

References

Oklahoma State
Oklahoma State Cowgirls basketball seasons
Oklahoma State
2014 in sports in Oklahoma
2015 in sports in Oklahoma